Nicolai Mick Jørgensen (born 15 January 1991) is a Danish professional footballer who plays as a forward. He is currently a free agent.

Club career

Akademisk Boldklub
Nicolai Jørgensen began his career at Grantoften IF, he later joined Skovlunde IF and joined Akademisk Boldklub afterwards, where he played for nine years apart from half a year as a U-15 player in Brøndby IF.

Bayer Leverkusen
Jørgensen joined German team Bayer 04 Leverkusen for their pre-season training camp in July scoring four goals in his first 45-minute appearance, and was subsequently signed for a five-year contract with Leverkusen on 12 July 2010. He made his Bundesliga debut in a 3–6 defeat to Borussia Mönchengladbach on 29 August 2010 being introduced as a substitute after 63 minutes.

F.C. Copenhagen
In July 2012, Jørgensen returned to his native Denmark joining F.C. Copenhagen on a one-year loan. In September, the club announced to have had exercised a purchase option, making the deal permanent with Jørgensen signing a contract until 2016.

Feyenoord
During the summer of 2016, Jørgensen joined Feyenoord for €3.5 million signing a five-year deal. In his first season at the club he became the Eredivisie's top scorer with 21 goals, helping Feyenoord to win their first title since 1999.

On 22 April 2018, he scored the opening goal as Feyenoord won the 2017–18 KNVB Cup final 3–0 against AZ Alkmaar.

On 14 June 2019, Feyenoord announced that they had reached principle agreement with Jørgensen to extend his contract until 2022.

Return to Copenhagen
After terminating his contract with Turkish club Kasımpaşa, Jørgensen returned to his former club F.C. Copenhagen on 31 January 2022, signing a deal for the rest of the season. After a disappointing season with one goal in nine games, Jørgensen left the club in June 2022, as his contract came to an end.

International career
On 4 October 2010, Jørgensen was called up for the Denmark's national football team, for the matches against Portugal and Cyprus in the UEFA Euro 2012 qualifying Group H. He scored the winning goal in the 70th minute against Belarus on 14 June 2011 in the 2011 UEFA European U-21 Football Championship. On 14 November 2015, he scored his first international goal for Denmark national football team in the UEFA Euro 2016 qualifying Playoffs against Sweden. Denmark had lost 1–2 to Sweden but it was a crucial away goal for Denmark.

In June 2018 he was named in Denmark's squad for the 2018 FIFA World Cup in Russia.

Career statistics

Club

International

Scores and results list Denmark's goal tally first, score column indicates score after each Jørgensen goal.

Honours
Copenhagen
Danish Superliga: 2012–13, 2015–16
Danish Cup: 2014–15, 2015–16

Feyenoord
Eredivisie: 2016–17
KNVB Cup: 2017–18
Johan Cruijff Shield: 2017, 2018

Individual
Eredivisie top scorer: 2016–17

References

External links

Interview in Metro 
Landsholdsudtagelse 
F.C. Copenhagen profile 

1991 births
Living people
People from Ballerup
Association football forwards
Danish men's footballers
Denmark international footballers
Denmark under-21 international footballers
Denmark youth international footballers
Danish expatriate men's footballers
Akademisk Boldklub players
Bayer 04 Leverkusen players
1. FC Kaiserslautern players
F.C. Copenhagen players
Feyenoord players
Kasımpaşa S.K. footballers
Danish Superliga players
Bundesliga players
Eredivisie players
Süper Lig players
Expatriate footballers in the Netherlands
Expatriate footballers in Germany
Expatriate footballers in Turkey
Danish expatriate sportspeople in the Netherlands
Danish expatriate sportspeople in Germany
Danish expatriate sportspeople in Turkey
2018 FIFA World Cup players
Ballerup-Skovlunde Fodbold players
Sportspeople from the Capital Region of Denmark